Zenon Kitowski (born 1962) is one of the most talented and recognized clarinet players of Poland. He was born in a Kashubian town of Kartuzë (pol. Kartuzy). After winning the Kurpiński International Clarinet Competition in Włoszakowice (Poland) in 1982, Kitowski accepted principal clarinetist position with Jerzy Maksymiuk’s Polish Chamber Orchestra and Sinfonia Varsovia.  As a renowned musician, Zenon has appeared frequently as soloist with the Polish Radio and Television Orchestra in Warsaw where he has been holding the principal clarinetist chair since 1993. Zenon Kitowski also collaborates with various chamber ensembles and while his playing captivates with agility and ease, his rich and warm tone combined with incredible control which affords him with the superior skills needed to express full dynamic and emotional range of any orchestral or soloist work.

Kitowski is also an accomplished clarinet teacher. A student of late Władysław Świercz, Zenon not only inherited his warm, wooden clarinet tone but also developed the unique ability to convey years of his professional experience to students who often share some of these qualities.

References
Jack Brymer, Clarinet. (Yehudi Menuhin Music Guides) Hardback and paperback, 296 pages, Kahn & Averill.
David Pino, The Clarinet and Clarinet Playing. Providence: Dover Pubns, 1998.
Cyrille Rose, Artistic Studies, Book 1. ed. David Hite. San Antonio: Southern Music, 1986.
Various, Play Clarinet Today!. Leonard Hal Inc., (Creator.)
Hyacinthe Klose, Celebrated Method for the Clarinet: Complete Edition. Carl Fischer.

1962 births
Living people
People from Kartuzy
Clarinetists
Polish musicians
Kashubians
21st-century clarinetists